Fabrice Seidou (born 19 December 1986) is an Ivorian professional footballer who plays as a striker for Championnat National 2 club Saint-Pryvé Saint-Hilaire, for which he is the captain.

External links
 Fabrice Seidou profile at foot-national.com
 
 

1986 births
Living people
People from Bondoukou
Association football forwards
Ivorian footballers
Chamois Niortais F.C. players
Aviron Bayonnais FC players
US Orléans players
Genêts Anglet players
USJA Carquefou players
Saint-Pryvé Saint-Hilaire FC players
Ivorian expatriate footballers
Expatriate footballers in France
Ivorian expatriate sportspeople in France